Plymouth is a town in Windsor County, Vermont, United States. The population was 641 at the 2020 census. Calvin Coolidge, the 30th President of the United States, was born and raised in Plymouth and is buried there as well. The State of Vermont Division for Historic Preservation owns and maintains the Coolidge Homestead and the village of Plymouth Notch.

Geography

History

The old Coolidge store, run by John Calvin Coolidge, Sr., the President's father, housed the post office in the 1920s. John Coolidge's wife, Carrie, served as postmaster 1903–1917. Coolidge's father also founded Plymouth Cheese Factory, which continues to produce artisan cheese today.

Plymouth was one of thirteen Vermont towns isolated by flooding caused by Hurricane Irene in 2011.

Demographics

As of the census of 2000, there were 555 people, 251 households, and 168 families residing in the town.  The population density was 11.5 people per square mile (4.4/km2).  There were 773 housing units at an average density of 16.0 per square mile (6.2/km2).  The racial makeup of the town was 99.28% White, 0.36% African American, and 0.36% from two or more races.

There were 251 households, out of which 23.5% had children under the age of 18 living with them, 55.8% were married couples living together, 5.2% had a female householder with no husband present, and 32.7% were non-families. 27.1% of all households were made up of individuals, and 10.0% had someone living alone who was 65 years of age or older.  The average household size was 2.21 and the average family size was 2.59.

In the town, the population was spread out, with 18.0% under the age of 18, 2.9% from 18 to 24, 26.3% from 25 to 44, 33.2% from 45 to 64, and 19.6% who were 65 years of age or older.  The median age was 47 years. For every 100 females, there were 110.2 males.  For every 100 females age 18 and over, there were 107.8 males.

The median income for a household in the town was $43,438, and the median income for a family was $46,667. Males had a median income of $29,583 versus $27,917 for females. The per capita income for the town was $25,272.  About 3.5% of families and 5.4% of the population were below the poverty line, including 3.7% of those under age 18 and 8.7% of those age 65 or over.

References

External links

 Town of Plymouth community website
 President Calvin Coolidge State Historic Site

 
Towns in Vermont
Calvin Coolidge
Towns in Windsor County, Vermont